Marie Renaud (born 1964 or 1965) is a Canadian politician who was first elected in the 2015 Alberta general election to the Legislative Assembly of Alberta representing the electoral district of St. Albert and was re-elected on April 16, 2019.

Personal life 
Renaud holds a university certificate in counselling women from the Women's and Gender studies department at the University of Alberta, and a diploma in Community Disability Studies from MacEwan University.

Renaud has sat on various boards, including Handicapped Housing Society of Alberta, Alberta Avenue Business Revitalization Zone and Norwood Neighborhood Association. She has also served on various committees, including the Rehabilitation Practitioner Advisory Committee for MacEwan University and the St. Albert Accessible Transportation Advisory Committee.

Before being elected, Renaud worked at the Women's Economic and Business Solutions Society and seven years as an instructor at MacEwan University. Renaud also worked for Lo-Se-Ca Foundation as the Executive Director for almost 15 years.

Electoral history

2019 general election

2015 general election

References

1960s births
Alberta New Democratic Party MLAs
Living people
People from St. Albert, Alberta
Women MLAs in Alberta
21st-century Canadian politicians
21st-century Canadian women politicians